Voluta musica, common name the music volute, is a species of sea snail, a marine gastropod mollusk in the family Volutidae, the volutes.

Synonyms

 Voluta carneolata Lamarck, 1811
 Voluta chorea Röding, 1798
 Voluta confusa Röding, 1798
 Voluta fulva Lamarck, 1811
 Voluta incarnata Röding, 1798
 Voluta laevigata Röding, 1798
 Voluta lineata Röding, 1798
 Voluta maculata Röding, 1798
 Voluta musica guineensis Dillwyn, 1817
 Voluta musica typica Dall, 1907
 Voluta muta Röding, 1798
 Voluta nodulosa Lamarck, 1822
 Voluta plicata Dillwyn, 1817
 Voluta reticulata Röding, 1798
 Voluta rosea Röding, 1798
 Voluta rugifera Dall, 1907
 Voluta sulcata Lamarck, 1811
 Voluta thiarella Lamarck, 1811
 Voluta tobagoensis Verrill, 1953
 Voluta tobagoensis var. damula Dall, 1907
 Voluta tobagoensis var. guinaica Lamarck, 1811
 Voluta turbata Röding, 1798
 Voluta violacea Lamarck, 1811

Subspecies
 Voluta musica guineensis Dillwyn, 1817
 Voluta musica typica Dall, 1907

Distribution
The species occurs on the mainland Caribbean coast in Colombia and Venezuela, and in the West Indies from the following islands or countries: Dominican Republic, Puerto Rico, Virgin Islands, St. Lucia, Barbados, St. Vincent & the Grenadines, Grenada,  and Trinidad & Tobago.

Shell description

The maximum reported size of the shell is 115 mm.

These medium-sized, very solid, axially ribbed shells are characterized by delicate blackish to reddish brown markings on a creamy background color, with a characteristic series of lines resembling a musical manuscript (hence the common name "music volute").

Specimens from the Eastern Caribbean island of Barbados are pink in color (var. "carneolata"). Deeper-water Barbados examples trapped alive at around 100 m. depth are orange in color.

Ecology
Voluta musica is usually found alive in muddy and sandy substrate at depths of 5 m to 28 m., although at Barbados this species has been found with their dorsums dry as they crawl across exposed South Coast reefs at very low tide  and have been trapped alive at depths of about 100 m. along the island's West Coast.

It is a predatory carnivorous species, as is the case in other Volutidae. It feeds on invertebrates, bivalves,  other gastropods and on decayed material.

Life cycle
Embryos develop into free-swimming planktonic marine larvae (trocophore) and later into juvenile veligers.

Bibliography
 Abbott, Robert Tucker (1974) - American Seashells: The Marine Mollusca of the Atlantic and Pacific Coasts of North America. 2nd ed. - Van Nostrand Reinhold Company New York
 Dall, W. H. 1907. A review of the American Volutidae Smithsonian Miscellaneous Collections 48 341–373.
 Linnaeus, C. (1758). Systema Naturae per regna tria naturae, secundum classes, ordines, genera, species, cum characteribus, differentiis, synonymis, locis. Editio decima, reformata. Laurentius Salvius: Holmiae
 Verrill, A. H. 1950. Voluta musica, its forms, distribution and operculum Conchological Club of Southern California, Minutes 102 3–7.

References

External links 
 ITIS
 Encyclopedia of life

Volutidae
Gastropods described in 1758
Taxa named by Carl Linnaeus